Rahn Kariz (also Romanized as Rahn Kārīz; also known as Han Kārīz) is a village in Takht-e Jolgeh Rural District, in the Central District of Firuzeh County, Razavi Khorasan Province, Iran. At the 2006 census, its population was 387, in 92 families.

References 

Populated places in Firuzeh County